Ethminolia akuana is a species of sea snail, a marine gastropod mollusk in the family Trochidae, the top snails.

Description
The size of the shell attains 6 mm.

Distribution
This marine species occurs off Easter Island.

References

 Raines, B.K. (2007) New molluscan records from Easter Island, with the description of a new Ethminolia. Visaya, 2(1), 70-88 page(s): 71

External links
 

akuana
Gastropods described in 2007